Eduard "Edi" Kainberger (20 November 1911 – 7 March 1974) was an Austrian association football player who competed in the 1936 Summer Olympics. He was part of the Austrian team, which won the silver medal in the football tournament. He played all four matches as goalkeeper and captain.

References

External links
profile

1911 births
1974 deaths
Austrian footballers
Footballers at the 1936 Summer Olympics
Olympic footballers of Austria
Olympic silver medalists for Austria
Austria international footballers
Olympic medalists in football
Medalists at the 1936 Summer Olympics
Association football goalkeepers